Charles Briles (December 17, 1945 – June 12, 2016) was an American film and television actor. He played Eugene Barkley in the first season of the American western television series The Big Valley.

Life and career 
Briles was born in Gardena, California. When he was a teenager, he performed at the Weschester Playhouse with the Kentwood Players. Briles originally worked behind the scenes, but wanted to become an actor. He eventually got the role of Eugene Barkley in the new ABC western television series The Big Valley.

While appearing in The Big Valley, Briles received a draft notice in 1965 and had to leave the show. He served in the California Army National Guard until 1972. His character on The Big Valley was written out of the show, as Eugene Barkley went to study medicine in Berkeley.

After he stopped acting, Briles worked as a TV screenwriter. Briles also worked as a stage director on productions in Southern California, and he produced and wrote at the Northrop Corporation of California. He resided in Orcutt, California.

Death 
Briles died in June 2016 of congestive heart failure in Portland, Oregon, at the age of 71.

References

External links 

Rotten Tomatoes profile

1945 births
2016 deaths
People from Gardena, California
Male actors from California
American male film actors
American male television actors
20th-century American male actors
American theatre directors
Western (genre) television actors
House painters